Chief Ovia Idah (1903–1968) was a Nigerian sculptor, painter, carpenter, designer, and educator. He worked in many mediums including in ebony wood, ivory, plastic, as well as terracotta and cement. Idah's was active in Lagos in Lagos State, and Benin City in Edo State, but showed his work internationally. He is also known by the names Igbolovia Ida and Ovidah Ida.

Biography 
He was raised in a royal palace as a court official (or omada) from age 7 until age 15, where he learned carving skills serving as a page under Oba Eweka II of Benin. 

Idah was employment as a carpenter with the Public Works Department in Lagos from 1923 until 1947. He also taught at King's College in Lagos. Oba Akenzua II persuaded Idah to led the Benin Carvers Cooperative in Benin City in 1947.

Idah's sculptures broke from local carving traditions and had their own unique style. He was included as part of the book, "New Currents, Ancient Rivers: Contemporary African Artists in a Generation of Change" (Smithsonian Institution Press, 1992), one of the largest surveys of contemporary African art at the time.

See also 
 Edo people
 Kingdom of Benin

References 

1903 births
1968 deaths
20th-century Nigerian sculptors
20th-century Nigerian painters
Nigerian sculptors
Nigerian painters
People from Delta State
Artists from Lagos
People from Benin City
Edo people